Josefina Tapia Varas (born 25 April 2002) is a Chilean skateboarder and three-time Chilean National Skateboarding Champion in women's park. She competed in the women's park event at the 2020 Summer Olympics in Tokyo.

Personal life 
Tapia Varas is the youngest child of Isaac "Icha" Tapia Figueroa (1953–2015) and Alejandra Varas, two pioneers of surfing in Chile. She has two older brothers.

Sponsors
As of July 2021, Tapia Varas is sponsored by the following companies and organizations:
 Allskateboards
 Banco de Chile
Deportes Zapallar
Grizzly Griptape
 KiFit
 Mall Sport
 Naos Kingdom
 Rebull Lola
 Retro
Stance
 Team Chile
Vans

References

External links 
 
 Josefina Tapia at The Boardr
 Josefina Tapia Varas at Dew Tour

Living people
2002 births
Chilean skateboarders
Chilean sportswomen
Female skateboarders
Olympic skateboarders of Chile
Skateboarders at the 2020 Summer Olympics
Sportspeople from Valparaíso